Nathaniel Hawthorne McCombs (December 18, 1904 – July 15, 1965) was an American football player. He played college football for Haskell and professional football in the National Football League (NFL) as a guard and tackle for the Akron Indians and Buffalo Bisons. He appeared in 17 NFL games, 15 as a starter, during the 1926 and 1929 seasons.

References

1904 births
1965 deaths
Haskell Indian Nations Fighting Indians football players
Akron Indians players
Buffalo Bisons (NFL) players
Players of American football from Oklahoma